The women's 4 × 100 metres relay event at the 2005 Asian Athletics Championships was held in Incheon, South Korea on September 4.

Results

References

Results

2005 Asian Athletics Championships
Relays at the Asian Athletics Championships
2005 in women's athletics